Michael Henry Tavoa  was the third Bishop of Vanuatu, one of the nine dioceses that make up the Anglican Church of Melanesia.

References

2018 deaths
20th-century Anglican bishops in Oceania
Anglican bishops of New Hebrides, Vanuatu and New Caledonia
Diocese of Vanuatu and New Caledonia
Vanuatuan Anglican priests
Year of birth missing